Silvio Marcos Dulcich (born 1 October 1981 in Río Cuarto, Córdoba) is an Argentine football goalkeeper of Croatian descent, currently playing for Quilmes in Argentine Primera División.

Club title

External links
 
 
 Clausura 2005 Statistics & Apertura 2004 Statistics at Terra.com.ar 
 

1981 births
Living people
Argentine footballers
Association football goalkeepers
Boca Juniors footballers
Talleres de Córdoba footballers
Club Aurora players
Expatriate footballers in Bolivia
Sportspeople from Córdoba Province, Argentina
Argentine expatriate footballers
Argentine expatriate sportspeople in Bolivia
Huracán de Tres Arroyos footballers
Argentine people of Croatian descent